The 1979 NCAA Division I basketball tournament involved 40 schools playing in single-elimination play to determine the national champion of men's NCAA Division I college basketball. It began on March 9 and ended with the championship game on March 26 in Salt Lake City. A total of 40 games were played, including a national third-place game. This was the tournament's only edition with forty teams; the previous year's had 32, and it expanded to 48 in 1980. The 1979 Indiana State team was the most recent squad to reach a national title game with an undefeated record, holding that distinction for 42 years until the 2021 Gonzaga Bulldogs team won a 93-90 OT national semifinal over UCLA to reach the 2021 title contest vs. Baylor with a 31-0 record.

Michigan State, coached by Jud Heathcote, won the national title with a 75–64 victory in the final game over Indiana State, coached by Bill Hodges. Indiana State came into the game undefeated, but couldn't extend their winning streak.  Magic Johnson of Michigan State was named the tournament's Most Outstanding Player. Michigan State's victory over Indiana State was its first over a top-ranked team, and remained its only victory over a number one ranked team until 2007 (Wisconsin).

The final game marked the beginning of the rivalry between future Hall of Famers Johnson and Larry Bird. As of 2016, it remains the highest-rated game in the history of televised college basketball. Both Johnson and Bird would enter the NBA in the fall of 1979, and the rivalry between them and their teams (respectively, the Los Angeles Lakers and Boston Celtics) was a major factor in the league's renaissance in the 1980s and 1990s.  The game also led to the "modern era" of college basketball, as it introduced a nationwide audience to a sport that was once relegated to second-class status in the sports world.

With the loss in the championship game, Indiana State has finished as the national runner-up in the NAIA (1946, 1948), NCAA Division II (1968), and NCAA Division I (1979) tournaments, making them the only school to do so.

This was the first tournament in which all teams were seeded by the Division I Basketball Committee. The top six seeds in each regional received byes to the second round, while seeds 7–10 played in the first round.  

It is also notable as the last Final Four played in an on-campus arena, at the University of Utah. (The most recent tournament to be held on a university's premises (i.e. not on the university's main campus, but on a satellite or branch campus) was in 1983, as the University of New Mexico (UNM) hosted that year's tournament in The Pit (then officially known as University Arena), which is located on the UNM South Campus.) It has, however, been played in a team's regular off-campus home arena three times since then: in 1985 at Rupp Arena, Kentucky's home court, in 1994 at Charlotte Coliseum, UNCC’s home court, and in 1996 at Continental Airlines Arena, then Seton Hall's home court.  Given the use of domed stadiums for Final Fours for the foreseeable future, it is likely this will be the last Final Four on a college campus.  This tournament was the last until the 2019 tournament to see two finalists playing for the national championship for the first time.  The 1979 Final Four was the first in which all four schools came from east of the Mississippi River.

This was the first NCAA tournament where three officials were assigned to all games. Several conferences, including the Big Ten and Southeastern, used three officials for its regular season games prior to the NCAA adopting it universally.

Schedule and venues

The following are the sites that were selected to host each round of the 1979 tournament:

First and Second Rounds
March 9 and 11
East Region
 Reynolds Coliseum, Raleigh, North Carolina
Mideast Region
 Murphy Center, Murfreesboro, Tennessee
Midwest Region
 Allen Fieldhouse, Lawrence, Kansas
West Region
 Pauley Pavilion, Los Angeles, California
March 10 (second round only)
East Region
 Providence Civic Center, Providence, Rhode Island
Mideast Region
 Assembly Hall, Bloomington, Indiana
Midwest Region
 Moody Coliseum, Dallas, Texas
West Region
 McKale Center, Tucson, Arizona

Regional semifinals and finals (Sweet Sixteen and Elite Eight)
March 15 and 17
Midwest Regional, Riverfront Coliseum, Cincinnati, Ohio
West Regional, Marriott Center, Provo, Utah
March 16 and 18
East Regional, Greensboro Memorial Coliseum, Greensboro, North Carolina
Mideast Regional, Market Square Arena, Indianapolis, Indiana

National semifinals, 3rd-place game, and championship (Final Four and championship)
March 24 and 26
Special Events Center, Salt Lake City, Utah

Salt Lake City became the eighteenth different site of the Final Four, and the eighth Final Four to be held on a college campus. Due to the current setup of the Final Four, both of these are likely not to be repeated. Two new host cities, Cincinnati, Ohio and Murfreesboro, Tennessee, were included for the first time, hosting at the Riverfront Coliseum (the then-home arena of the Cincinnati Bearcats) and MTSU's Murphy Center, respectively. This year also marked the last time tournament games were held at the University of Kansas's legendary Allen Fieldhouse and at SMU's Moody Coliseum. As more and more tournament games are being held in large cities and NBA-caliber arenas, this was most likely the last time the Tournament will be held in Lawrence.

Tournament notes
In the East, the Round of 32 was called Black Sunday because of Penn's upset of #1 North Carolina and St. John's upset of #2-seeded Duke, both in Raleigh. Penn went all the way to the Final Four before losing to eventual champion Michigan State. Both teams had to defeat higher-seeded opponents in the Round of 40 to have the chance to beat UNC and Duke.  Penn beat three higher-seeded opponents to reach the Final Four, a feat which was later bettered in 1986 by LSU, 2006 by George Mason, and 2011 by Virginia Commonwealth, who each beat four higher-seeded opponents on the way to the Final Four.

Teams

Bracket
* – Denotes overtime period

East region

Mideast region

Midwest region

West region

Final Four

Announcers
 Dick Enberg, Billy Packer, and Al McGuire – Final Four at Salt Lake City, Utah 
 Dick Enberg and Al McGuire – Second Round at Providence, Rhode Island (Georgetown–Rutgers, Syracuse–Connecticut); Second Round at Murfreesboro, Tennessee (Michigan State–Lamar, Notre Dame–Tennessee); Mideast Regional Final at Indianapolis, Indiana; West Regional Final at Provo, Utah
 Jim Simpson and Billy Packer – Second Round at Tucson, Arizona (San Francisco–Brigham Young, Marquette–Pacific); Second Round at Lawrence, Kansas (Indiana State–Virginia Tech, Arkansas–Weber State); East Regional Final at Greensboro, North Carolina; Midwest Regional Final at Cincinnati, Ohio
 Jay Randolph and Gary Thompson – Midwest Regional semifinals at Cincinnati, Ohio
 Connie Alexander and Bill Strannigan – West Regional semifinals at Provo, Utah
 Marv Albert and Bucky Waters – Second Round at Raleigh, North Carolina (North Carolina–Pennsylvania, Duke–St. John's)
 Merle Harmon and Fred Taylor – Second Round at Bloomington, Indiana (Iowa–Toledo, LSU–Appalachian State)
 Jim Thacker and Gary Thompson – Second Round at Dallas, Texas (Louisville–South Alabama, Texas–Oklahoma)
 Jay Randolph and Lynn Shackelford – Second Round at Los Angeles, California (UCLA–Pepperdine, DePaul–USC)

See also
 1979 NCAA Division II basketball tournament
 1979 NCAA Division III basketball tournament
 1979 National Invitation Tournament
 1979 NAIA Division I men's basketball tournament
 1979 National Women's Invitation Tournament

References

NCAA Division I men's basketball tournament
Ncaa
Basketball in the Dallas–Fort Worth metroplex
NCAA Division I men's basketball tournament
NCAA Division I men's basketball tournament